Gosogliptin (INN; trade name Saterex) is a drug for the treatment of type II diabetes.  It is in the class of dipeptidyl peptidase-4 (DPP-4) inhibitors (also called gliptins). It was discovered and developed through Phase 1 and Phase 2 by Pfizer.  The crystal structure of DPP-4 in complex with gosogliptin is available.  Its metabolism, excretion and pharmacokinetics in rat, dog and human have been described. A cost efficient route has been published.  Other studies including Phase 3 studies were conducted in Russia. It is approved for use in Russia.

References 

Dipeptidyl peptidase-4 inhibitors
Pyrimidines
Piperazines
Organofluorides